Timothy James Rozon (born June 4, 1976) is a Canadian actor. He is known for his roles as Tommy Quincy on the CTV teen drama Instant Star, Mutt Schitt in the CBC comedy Schitt's Creek, Doc Holliday on the supernatural/western drama series Wynonna Earp, and Luke Roman in Surreal Estate, a real-estate drama with a supernatural theme.

Career
Rozon's first role was supporting Mira Sorvino in the 2000 A&E film The Great Gatsby. His big break came in 2004 when he landed the role of Tom "Tommy Q" Quincy in the CTV/TeenNick teen drama Instant Star, a role he played for four seasons. In 2018, he and the cast of Wynonna Earp received the People's Choice Award for Best Sci-Fi Show.

In 2022 he won the Canadian Screen Award for Best Supporting Actor in a Drama Program or Series at the 10th Canadian Screen Awards for Wynonna Earp.

Personal life
Rozon resides in Montreal where he co-owns the restaurant Garde Manger with Canadian celebrity chef Chuck Hughes.
He has been married to equestrian Linzey Govan Rozon since 2015; they have a son born in 2020.

Filmography

References

External links

 

1976 births
Living people
20th-century Canadian male actors
21st-century Canadian male actors
Anglophone Quebec people
Businesspeople from Montreal
Canadian male film actors
Canadian male models
Canadian male television actors
Canadian male voice actors
Canadian restaurateurs
Canadian Screen Award winners
Male actors from Montreal
Best Supporting Actor in a Drama Series Canadian Screen Award winners